Siv Nina Anette Holmén (née Wärn; born 29 September 1951, in Esse) is a Finnish former long-distance runner.

Nina Holmén won the first European Championship in women's 3000 meters running in 1974. She competed also in Olympics 1976 finishing 9th in 1500 meters running. Her best event, 3000 meters, was not in the Olympic schedule that time.

Nina Holmén also competed successfully in cross-country running. She won silver medal in World Cross Country Championships in 1974. In 1973 she was 10th. In addition she won two medals in team race.

Personal bests 
800m 2:03,67 (Turku 4.7.1976)
1500m 4:06,93 (Turku 2.7.1976),
Mile 4:38,4 (Vantaa 27.5.1976)
3000m 8:55,10 (Rome 2.9.1974),
5000m 16:04,2 (Jakobstad 30.5.1976),

External links
 Nina Holmén's profile in Tilaspaja

1951 births
Living people
People from Pedersöre
Finnish female long-distance runners
Athletes (track and field) at the 1976 Summer Olympics
Olympic athletes of Finland
European Athletics Championships medalists
Sportspeople from Ostrobothnia (region)